The Second Congregational Church in Memphis, Tennessee is a historic church structure at 764 Walker Avenue.  The building was started in 1928 and was added to the National Register of Historic Places in 1982.

It was designed and/or built by Frank Nesbit and Harold E. Smith.

The church was founded in 1868. It is presently affiliated with the United Church of Christ, one of three such congregations in the Memphis area.

See also
 National Register of Historic Places listings in Shelby County, Tennessee

References

Memphis SecondCongregational
Memphis SecondCongregational
Memphis SecondCongregational
Churches in Memphis, Tennessee
National Register of Historic Places in Memphis, Tennessee